Savo Raković (Serbian Cyrillic: Саво Раковић; born 1 October 1985) is a Serbian professional footballer who plays as a defender.

Career
Raković started out at his hometown club Sloga Požega, before switching to Sevojno in the 2004 winter transfer window. He spent the following six and a half seasons there, before moving abroad to Hungary in 2010. After two and a half years at Diósgyőri VTK, Raković moved to Egri FC in early 2013.

Honours
Sevojno
 Serbian Cup: Runner-up 2008–09

References

External links
 HLSZ profile
 
 

Association football defenders
Diósgyőri VTK players
Egri FC players
Expatriate footballers in Hungary
FK Sevojno players
FK Sloboda Užice players
Nemzeti Bajnokság I players
Nyíregyháza Spartacus FC players
People from Požega, Serbia
Serbian expatriate footballers
Serbian expatriate sportspeople in Hungary
Serbian First League players
Serbian footballers
Serbian SuperLiga players
1985 births
Living people